This is a list of Prva HNL players who have made 200 or more appearances in the Croatian First Football League. Statistics are updated as of 16 April 2022.

Key
  Players with this background and symbol are still playing in the Prva HNL. Bold indicates current club.
The name used for each club is the name they had when player most recently played a league match for them. 
Seasons =  number of seasons a player had participated in Prva HNL; Years = a span between the first and most recent year a player had played a match in Prva HNL

List of players

References
General
 

        
Prva HNL players
Association football player non-biographical articles